Nitella capillaris is a species of stonewort belonging to the family Characeae.

It is native to Europe and Northern America.

References

Charophyta